Le Sueur or Lesueur is a French surname. Notable people with the surname include:

 Hubert Le Sueur (c. 1580 – 1658), French sculptor
 Jean Le Sueur (c. 1598 – 1668, also known as Abbé Saint-Sauveur), French-born Quebecois  priest
 Eustache Le Sueur (1617 – 1655), painter and a founder of the French Academy
 Pierre-Charles Le Sueur (c. 1657 – 1704), French trapper and explorer of North America
 Jacques-François le Sueur (fl. 1704 – 1754), French Jesuit missionary and linguist of the Abnaki in Canada
 Jacques-Philippe Le Sueur (1759–1830), French sculptor
 Jean-François Le Sueur (1760 – 1837), French composer
 Charles Alexandre Lesueur (1778–1846), French naturalist-illustrator and explorer of Australia, Southeast Asia, and North America
 Pierre-Étienne Lesueur (fl. 1791-1810), French painter
 Marie Lesieur (1799–1890), known as Lesueur,  French ballet dancer
 Georges Lesueur (1834–1910), French engineer, public works contractor, Senator of Algeria from 1888 to 1897
 Daniel Lesueur, pen name of Jeanne Lapauze, née Loiseau (1860–1920),  French poet and novelist
 Arthur LeSueur (1867?–1950?), American socialist newspaper editor and Socialist mayor of Minot, North Dakota
 Florence LeSueur (1898–1991), African-American civil rights activist and the first female president of a NAACP chapter
 Meridel Le Sueur nee Wharton (1900–1996), American writer and political activist, stepdaughter of  Arthur Le Sueur 
 Hal LeSueur (c.1901 or 1903 – 1963), American actor and elder brother of Joan Crawford
 Lucille Fay LeSueur, real name of Joan Crawford (c.1904, 1905, 1906 or 1908 – 1977), film actress and sister of Hal
 Raoul Lesueur (1912–1981), French cyclist
 Terry Le Sueur (born 1942?), politician and  Chief Minister of Jersey
 Clinton LeSueur (born 1969), Mississippi politician
 Emily LeSueur (born 1972), US synchronized swimmer
 Éloyse Lesueur (born 1988), French long jumper

French-language surnames
Surnames of Norman origin
Occupational surnames